Denis Churkin may refer to:

 Denis Churkin (footballer, born 1979), Russian football player
 Denis Churkin (footballer, born 2001), Russian football player